The 1959 National League was the 25th season and the fourteenth post-war season of the highest tier of motorcycle speedway in Great Britain.

Summary
With Ipswich Witches dropping down to the Southern Area League, only 9 teams competed with Wimbledon Dons continuing their domination of British speedway with their fifth title in six years.

Final table

Top Ten Riders (League only)

National Trophy
The 1959 National Trophy was the 21st edition of the Knockout Cup. Wimbledon were the winners.

First round

Second round

Semifinals

Final

First leg

Second leg

Wimbledon were National Trophy Champions, winning on aggregate 123–93.

See also
 List of United Kingdom Speedway League Champions
 Knockout Cup (speedway)

References

Speedway National League
1959 in speedway
1959 in British motorsport